The Wechsel is a low mountain range in eastern Austria whose highest summit is the Hochwechsel. It also has two other summits over 1700 m. The massif forms the border between the states of Lower Austria and Styria for about 15 km, southeast of the Semmering and northeast of the Graz Basin, between the Feistritz Saddle and the eponymous pass of Wechsel.

Geography 

The Wechsel is part of the Prealps East of the Mur. It is – apart from the Vienna Woods which are half the height – the easternmost range in the Alps. From there the crest of the mountains runs northwest to the Umschußriegel continuing to the Schöberlriegel, and east to the Niederwechsel.

The Wechsel is the boundary between the Styrian Joglland and the Bucklige Welt, which stretches from the Vienna Basin to the extreme southeast of Lower Austria. To the east this region transitions into the Pinka valley, the Güns Mountains and the Pannonian Plain.

Important settlements at the foot of the Wechsel, which benefit from tourism associated with the mountain, are Aspang, Aspangberg-St. Peter, Dechantskirchen, Feistritz am Wechsel, Friedberg, Kirchberg am Wechsel, Mönichkirchen, Mönichwald, Pinggau, Trattenbach, Sankt Corona am Wechsel, Sankt Jakob im Walde, Sankt Lorenzen am Wechsel, Vorau, Waldbach and Wenigzell.

References

Further reading

External links 

 
 

Mountain ranges of Lower Austria
Mountain ranges of Styria
Mountain ranges of the Alps
Mountains of Lower Austria
Mountains of Styria
Mountains of the Alps
Neunkirchen District, Austria
Prealps East of the Mur
Ski areas and resorts in Austria